Better than You is a collaborative mixtape by American rappers DaBaby and YoungBoy Never Broke Again. It was released through record labels Atlantic Records, Interscope Records, South Coast Music Group, and Never Broke Again on March 4, 2022. The mixtape was supported by three singles: "Hit", "Neighborhood Superstar", and "Bestie". It includes production from Cardo, Johnny Juliano, Yung Exclusive, Cheese, BlakeSale, Leor, TnTXD, Ambezza, Uzoh, and Kayothewizard, among others.

Release and promotion
On January 10, 2022, DaBaby and YoungBoy released a two-track bundle on YouTube, titled Bestie / Hit, which consisted of the songs "Bestie" and "Hit", as part one and part two, respectively. "Hit" was released to streaming services as the lead single from Better than You the same day, while "Bestie" remained on YouTube without an official release until the mixtape's release. On February 24, Navjosh of online hip hop website HipHopNMore published an article, in which he said that the website "can exclusively confirm" the mixtape and its details. The next day, DaBaby and YoungBoy released the second single, "Neighborhood Superstar". On February 28, 2022, DaBaby reacted to the news and subtly revealed the cover art and tracklist, referring to the joint effort as the "collab of the century".

Critical reception

Writing for HotNewHipHop, Erika Marie predicted that "the very mention of Better Than You" can create controversy, especially considering King Von's posthumous album, What It Means to Be King was also released today (March 4)" and felt that "Louisiana and North Carolina collide as DaBaby and YoungBoy only rely on one another's talents on the record". Thomas Galindo of HotNewHipHop felt that YoungBoy's voice sounded like fellow American rapper Playboi Carti throughout the mixtape. 

In a mixed review of it, Preezy Brown of Vibe opined that "taking a more melodic approach throughout, YoungBoy leaves much of the traditional rapping to DaBaby, who rises to the occasion with a succession of cocksure rhyme spills tinged with oddball humor", adding that it "falls short of that lofty expectation and is spotty at best", "but the record includes moments that merit giving it a listen to hear two of the biggest superstars in rap joining forces if nothing else." Tivo Staff from AllMusic stated that "Better Than You doesn't expose any new collaborative chemistry, but offers several solid tracks of DaBaby doing what he does best, while NBA YoungBoy tries on some new guises".

Commercial performance
BETTER THAN YOU debuted at number ten on the US Billboard 200 chart, earning 28,500 album-equivalent units (including 1,000 copies in pure album sales) in its first week. The album also accumulated a total of 40.35 million on-demand streams of the album's songs.

Track listing
All tracks are mixed, mastered, and recorded by producer Cheese. Alejandro Rodriguez-Dawson joins Cheese in recording for tracks 10 and 12.

Personnel
 DaBaby – rap vocals
 YoungBoy Never Broke Again – rap vocals
 Jason Goldberg – mastering, mixing, engineering
 India Got Them Beats – bass, drums, percussion (2)
 Leor – bass, drums, percussion (2)
 Jahniya C – guitar, keyboards (2)
 Alejandro Rodriguez-Dawsøn – engineering (10, 12)

Charts

References

2022 mixtape albums
DaBaby albums
YoungBoy Never Broke Again albums
Atlantic Records albums
Interscope Records albums
Albums produced by Cardo